Mount Repose may refer to:

in the United States
(by state)
Mount Repose (Natchez, Mississippi), listed on the NRHP in Mississippi
 Mount Repose, Ohio